Manes is a legendary figure of the 2nd millennium BC who is attested by Herodotus in Book One of Histories to have been an early king of Lydia, then probably known as Maeonia (which he may be the eponym of).
He was believed to have been the son of Zeus and Gaia, and was the father of Atys, who succeeded him as king. Atys, through Callithea, fathered Lydus, after whom the Lydian people were later named, and Tyrrhenus, after whom the Tyrrhenians were named.
Later, in Book Four, Herodotus states that Manes had another son called Cotys, who, through Halie, had a son called Asies, after whom the Lydians claimed that the continent of Asia is named. Dionysius of Halicarnassus names Callirhoe, daughter of Oceanus, as the mother of Cotys by Manes, and Atys as the son of Cotys.

Genealogy

See also 
 List of kings of Lydia

Notes

References 
 Dionysius of Halicarnassus, Roman Antiquities, Volume I: Books 1-2, translated by Earnest Cary, Loeb Classical Library No. 319, Cambridge, Massachusetts, Harvard University Press, 1937. Online version at Harvard University Press. Online version by Bill Thayer.
 Grimal, Pierre, The Dictionary of Classical Mythology, Wiley-Blackwell, 1996. .
 Herodotus, The Persian Wars, Volume I: Books 1-2, translated by A. D. Godley, Loeb Classical Library No. 117, Cambridge, Massachusetts, Harvard University Press, 1920. . Online version at Harvard University Press. Online version at the Perseus Digital Library.
 Herodotus, The Persian Wars, Volume II: Books 3-4, translated by A. D. Godley, Loeb Classical Library No. 118, Cambridge, Massachusetts, Harvard University Press, 1921. . Online version at Harvard University Press. Online version at the Perseus Digital Library.
 Rawlinson, George, History of Herodotus, Volume I, second edition, London, John Murray, 1862. Internet Archive.

Kings of Lydia
Children of Zeus
Children of Gaia
Mythological kings